Platform is a 2001 novel by French writer Michel Houellebecq (translated into English by Frank Wynne). It has received both great praise and great criticism, most notably for the novel's apparent condoning of sex tourism and Islamophobia. After describing Islam as "the most stupid religion" in a published interview about the book, Houellebecq was charged for inciting racial and religious hatred but the charges were ultimately dismissed, as it has been ruled that the right to free speech encompasses the right to criticize religions.

The novel and its author have been deemed "prophetic" or "prescient", as the last part depicts an Islamic terrorist attack which bears strong similarities with the bombings in Bali in October 2002, about a year later (and the novel was published on 27 August 2001, a few days before the 11 September 2001 attacks). A similar coincidence, involving Houellebecq, Islam and terrorism, would occur 13 years later, when his novel Submission, dealing with Islam again (although in a more nuanced and less confrontational way), was published on 7 January 2015, the day of the Charlie Hebdo shooting.

A play in Spanish based on the book, adapted and directed by Calixto Bieito, premiered at the 2006 Edinburgh International Festival.

Plot summary
The story is the first-person narrative of a fictional character named Michel Renault, a Parisian civil servant who, after the death of his father and thanks to a hefty inheritance, engages in sex tourism in Thailand, where he meets a travel agent named Valérie. Valerie and Renault begin an affair, and, after moving back to France, hatch a plan with Valerie's boss (who works in the travel industry in the Aurore group, an allusion to the real-life Accor group) to launch a new variety of package holiday called "friendly tourism", implicitly aimed at Europeans looking for a sexual experience whilst on vacation. Single men and women—and even couples—are to be targeted, and would vacation in specially designed "Aphrodite Clubs".

Initially, the name "Venus clubs"—an allusion to the Villa Venus clubs dreamed of by Eric Veen in Vladimir Nabokov's classic Ada or Ardor—is suggested, but is rejected as being too explicit. It is decided that Thailand is the best location for the new clubs, with the advertising making it clear that Thai women would also be easily available. The tours are to be marketed predominantly to German consumers, as it is perceived that there will be less moral outrage in Germany than in France.

Michel, Valerie and her boss Jean-Yves travel to Thailand on one of their company's tours incognito and enjoy an idyllic holiday. They decide that they will move to Thailand permanently, to perpetuate the bliss they experience there. However, towards the end of their holiday, Muslim extremists commit a terrorist act in which Valérie is killed. Michel is left bereft, and at the end of the novel he travels back to Thailand to die. At this point, the reader realizes that the novel is in fact his suicide note.

See also 
 Criticism of Islam
 Female sex tourism
 Sex tourism

References

External links
 'Confused Extremes', review of Platform in the Oxonian Review 

2001 French novels
Books critical of Islam
Novels by Michel Houellebecq
French novels adapted into plays
Éditions Flammarion books